Robert John Munce (1895–1975) served as the third president of Suffolk University in Boston, Massachusetts from 1954 to 1960.

Munce was born in Washington, Pennsylvania on January 25, 1895 to Robert John Munce, Sr. and Elizabeth M. Donley.  Munce graduated from Washington and Jefferson College in 1918 and received an AM in 1926 from the University of Michigan. Munce became president of Suffolk University in 1954 and served until 1960.

References

University of Michigan alumni
Washington & Jefferson College alumni
Presidents of Suffolk University
1895 births
1975 deaths
20th-century American academics